Muhammadiyah University of Magelang (Universitas Muhammadiyah Magelang, abbreviated as Unimma) is a private university that belongs to Muhammadiyah organisation. The university was founded in Magelang, Central Java, Indonesia on August 31, 1964.

History
Initially, Muhammadiyah University of Magelang was a branch of Muhammadiyah University of Jakarta. It later split off. Between 2008 and 2011, Muhammadiyah University of Magelang was directed and chaired by Prof. Dr. Achmadi. It is now led by Ir. Eko Muh. Widodo.

Campuses
Muhammadiyah University of Magelang has two main campuses:

Campus I
Campus I is in Magelang City, known as Tidar Campus (in Bahasa: Kampus Tidar). The campus has two main wing buildings for administrative offices, students offices, research center, library, and faculties such as economic, law, and education.

Campus II
Campus II is on Jl. Bambang Soegeng, Mertoyudan Magelang. It is known as Mertoyudan Campus (in Bahasa: Kampus Mertoyudan). It is close to the Magelang-Jogja highway. Campus II is used by the faculties of Health, Industrial Engineering and Informatics, and Islamic Studies. The campus, which consist of three main buildings, also functions as administrative offices, library, radio station (Unimma FM), Shariah micro bank (BMT Shariah), and mini market.

In 2011, the university finished a building for rectors office, academic and administrative office, quality insurance office, Center of Research office, and meeting rooms.

Presidents/Rectors 
 Drs. H. Masman Andara, 1991–1999
 Drs. Mashuri Maschab, 1999–2004
 Dr. H. Chairil Anwar, 2004–2006
 Prof. Dr.H. Ahmadi, 2006–2012
 Ir. Eko Muh. Widodo MT, 2012–2020

Faculties and studies program

UMM is categorized as a middle university in Indonesia. Every year, it receives 1000-1500 student applications from around Indonesia. The majority of students come from Central Java, especially from Kedu plateau areas such as Magelang, Temanggung, Wonosobo, Banjarnegara, Kebumen, and Purworejo.

Muhammadiyah University of Magelang offers studies program for undergraduate students. There are six faculties: Economics, Law, Education, Technic, Health, and Islamic studies.

Faculty of Economics
 Management (S1)
 Accounting (S1)

Faculty of Law
 Private Law (S1)
 Criminal Law (S1)
 State Administration Law (S1)

Faculty of Education
 Guidance and Counseling (S1)
 Education for Pre-school Pedagogy (S1)

Faculty of Science and Technology
 Industrial Engineering (S1)
 Computer Science and Informatics (S1 and D3)
 Automotive (D3)

Faculty of Health Science
 Nurse (S1 and D3)
 Pharmacy (S1 and D3)

Faculty of Islamic Studies
 Islamic Education (S1)
 Islamic Economic Sciences and Banking (S1)
 The Education of Islamic Primary School Teachers (S1)

Accreditation status

Centers and offices
 The Quality Insurance Board functions to insure the university quality in learning and academic activities.
 The Center of Research and Services for Society (LP3M) helps researchers conduct their work, such as research training, funding, and assistance in getting an access to sponsorship from funding partners either from the government or aid foundation.
 The Center of Islamic Studies (P3SI) is focused on Islamic guidance and counseling for students and university staff. Beside that, the center is responsibility in designing and implementing Islamic curriculum standard of UMM.
 The Language Center (Pusat Bahasa) gives language training and courses for students and lecturers. The center provides for English courses for the students.
 Library.

Facilities and student welfare
 Wall Climbing
 Theater (Teater Fajar)
 Scout
 Martial Art (Tapak Suci Putra Muhammadiyah=TPSM)
 Economic Cooperation Unit (Unit Koperasi Mahasiswa)
 Music
 Choir Unit
 Adventure and Nature Lover (Mentari)
 Journalism (Suara Mahasiswa)
 Muhammadiyah Students Association (in Bahasa: Ikatan Mahasiswa Muhammadiyah, IMM)
 Students Body Organization consists of executive and representative body in university level and faculty (Badan executive Mahasiswa (BEM) and Badan Perwakilan Mahasiswa (BPM))

Scholarship
The scholarships consist of two main resources: the government and the private sector, such as jarum, Gudang Garam, Super Semar, Muhammadiyah Foundation, Indonesian Ministry of education, Indonesian Ministry of Religious Affairs, and other sponsors.

References

External links
 Muhammadiyah University of Magelang 

Magelang
Veterinary schools in Indonesia
ASEAN University Network
Muhammadiyah University
Universities in Central Java
Universities in Magelang
Private universities and colleges in Indonesia